In enzymology, a methionine—tRNA ligase is an enzyme that catalyzes the chemical reaction

ATP + L-methionine + tRNAMet  AMP + diphosphate + L-methionyl-tRNAMet

The 3 substrates of this enzyme are ATP, L-methionine, and tRNA(Met), whereas its 3 products are AMP, diphosphate, and L-methionyl-tRNA(Met).

This enzyme belongs to the family of ligases, to be specific those forming carbon-oxygen bonds in aminoacyl-tRNA and related compounds.  The systematic name of this enzyme class is L-methionine:tRNAMet ligase (AMP-forming). Other names in common use include methionyl-tRNA synthetase, methionyl-transfer ribonucleic acid synthetase, methionyl-transfer ribonucleate synthetase, methionyl-transfer RNA synthetase, methionine translase, and MetRS.  This enzyme participates in 3 metabolic pathways: methionine metabolism, selenoamino acid metabolism, and aminoacyl-trna biosynthesis.

Role in oxidative stress 
During oxidative stress, methionine—tRNA ligase might be phosphorylated, which results in promiscuity of this enzyme, where it aminoacylates methionine to various non-Met tRNAs. This in turn leads to substitution of amino acids in proteins with methionine, which helps relieve oxidative stress in the cell.

Structural studies

References

Further reading 

 
 

EC 6.1.1
Enzymes of known structure